Nuria Olivé Vancells (born 20 August 1968 in Barcelona, Catalonia) is a former field hockey player from Spain. She was a member of the Women's National Team that won the gold medal at the 1992 Summer Olympics on home soil (Barcelona).

References

External links
 

1968 births
Spanish female field hockey players
Olympic field hockey players of Spain
Field hockey players at the 1992 Summer Olympics
Living people
Olympic gold medalists for Spain
Field hockey players from Barcelona
Olympic medalists in field hockey
Medalists at the 1992 Summer Olympics
Atlètic Terrassa players
20th-century Spanish women